NMK may refer to:
Makura language, ISO 639-3 language code NMK
Naša mala klinika, Balkan televised series
National Museums of Kenya
Newmarket (Suffolk) railway station, National Rail station code NMK
NMK (company) (Nihon Maicom Kaihatsu), a Japanese video game developer
North Macedonia, a country in Europe